DC Super Hero Girls or DC Superhero Girls (in various countries) is an American superhero action figure franchise created by Warner Bros. Consumer Products and DC Entertainment that launched in the third quarter of 2015.

Characters table
      = Main cast (credited) 
      = Recurring cast (3+ episodes)

Main characters
Main characters recurring across all DC Super Hero Girls franchise media.

Recurring characters

Appearing in both series

Exclusive to the 2019 television series

Exclusive to the 2015 web series
{| class="wikitable" style="width:100%; margin-right:auto; background:#fff"
|- style="color:black"
|-
| colspan="6" style="background:#02229b;"|
|-
!Exclusive to the 2015 web series
|
|-
|colspan="6"|
  (voiced by Misty Lee) — Formerly a member of the Female Furies, who reformed while in prison and is willing to lend her enhanced strength to her superheroine friends.
  (voiced by Nika Futterman) – She, as hall monitor, ensures that students always follow the rules. She plans her day to the minute. Not only does she keep order among her classmates, but her superb detective skills are useful all throughout the city. Has trouble with making Cheetah follow the speed limit in the Halls.
 Amanda Waller (voiced by Yvette Nicole Brown) — The principal of Super Hero High School.
 Gorilla Grodd (voiced by John DiMaggio) — The vice-principal of Super Hero High School and a reformed supervillain.
 Crazy Quilt (voiced by Tom Kenny) — A teacher who teaches Intro to Super Suits.
 Etrigan the Demon — The poetry teacher.
 Lucius Fox (voiced by Phil LaMarr) — A teacher who teaches Weaponomics.
 Red Tornado (voiced by Maurice LaMarche) — A teacher who teaches Flyer's Education.
 Wildcat (voiced by John DiMaggio) — The gym teacher.
 Liberty Belle — A teacher.
 Parasite (voiced by Tom Kenny) — The janitor at Super Hero High School who cleans up the messes caused by the students.
 Granny Goodness (voiced by April Stewart) — Doesn't look all that fit. Pretends to be the Super Hero High School's kindly librarian, but tries to take over the school with her villain army. Her plan failed and she was arrested.
 Female Furies — A team of villainous teenagers from Apokolips.
 Artemiz (voiced by Teala Dunn in a German accent) — A member of the Female Furies who is an expert at archery.
 Lashina (voiced by Jessica DiCicco) — A whip-wielding member of the Female Furies.
 Mad Harriet (voiced by Misty Lee) — A vicious member of the Female Furies. She wears metal claws.
 Speed Queen (voiced by Mae Whitman for seasons 2—4, Ashlyn Selich in season 5) — A super-fast member of the Female Furies.
 Stompa (voiced by April Stewart) — A super-strong member of the Female Furies.
 Dark Opal (voiced by Sean Schemmel) — Evil warlord, commander of his shadow army that tries to take over the school.
 Eclipso (voiced by Mona Marshall) — Queenly partner of Dark Opal. With him, she collects priceless gems to increase her power. Her main targets are SHH's Amethyst and Supergirl's crystal that possesses extraordinary power.
 Double Dare Twins (both voiced by Lauren Tom) — Twin thieves.
 Darkseid (voiced by John DiMaggio) — The leader of Big Barda's home planet who went undercover as a math teacher known as "Dr. Seid

Guest characters

Appearing in both series

Exclusive to the 2019 television series

Have my friends 2015

Exclusive to the 2015 web series

References

DC Super Hero Girls
DC Super Hero Girls
DC Super Hero Girls